Several ships of the Argentine Navy have been named Sarandí

, a schooner in service during the Cisplatine War

Argentine Navy ship names